Ivan Pavlov Goranov (born 10 June 1992) is a Bulgarian professional footballer who plays as a left-back for Liga I club Universitatea Cluj.

Club career

Born in Velingrad, Goranov started his career at Chepinets, but joined Levski Sofia when he was 15 years old. He made his A PFG debut against Vidima-Rakovski, as a 64th-minute substitute in a 2–0 Levski home victory on 2 April 2011.

On 8 June 2011, Beroe Stara Zagora accepted a bid for winger Todor Hristov from Levski, the deal was reported to be worth €100,000, including the transfer of Goranov to Beroe.

On 20 June 2016, Goranov signed with Lokomotiv Plovdiv.  On 9 June 2017, the Bulgarian Football Union announced that his contract had been terminated due to the club's fault. Four days later, he was signed by Levski Sofia for 3 years.

On 13 February 2023, Goranov signed a contract with Romanian first division club Universitatea Cluj.

International career
Goranov received his first call-up for senior Bulgarian squad on 29 August 2018 for the UEFA Nations League matches against Slovenia and Norway on 6 and 9 September. He made his debut against the former, coming on as a late substitute for Todor Nedelev.

International

Honours

Club
Beroe
Bulgarian Cup: 2012–13
Bulgarian Supercup: 2013

Levski Sofia
Bulgarian Cup: 2021–22

References

External links
 
 Profile at LevskiSofia.info

1992 births
Living people
People from Velingrad
Bulgarian footballers
Bulgaria under-21 international footballers
Bulgaria international footballers
First Professional Football League (Bulgaria) players
Second Professional Football League (Bulgaria) players
Belgian Pro League players
Super League Greece players
Liga I players
PFC Levski Sofia players
PFC Beroe Stara Zagora players
PFC Litex Lovech players
PFC Lokomotiv Plovdiv players
R. Charleroi S.C. players
PAS Lamia 1964 players
FC Universitatea Cluj players
Association football defenders
Bulgarian expatriate footballers
Expatriate footballers in Belgium
Expatriate footballers in Greece
Expatriate footballers in Romania
Bulgarian expatriate sportspeople in Belgium
Bulgarian expatriate sportspeople in Greece
Bulgarian expatriate sportspeople in Romania